The 1993 Pulitzer Prizes were:

Journalism awards 
Public Service:
The Miami Herald, for coverage that not only helped readers cope with Hurricane Andrew's devastation but also showed how lax zoning, inspection and building codes had contributed to the destruction.
Spot News Reporting:
Staff of the Los Angeles Times, for balanced, comprehensive, penetrating coverage under deadline pressure of the second, most destructive day of the Los Angeles riots.
Investigative Reporting:
Jeff Brazil and Stephen Berry, Orlando Sentinel, for exposing the unjust seizure of millions of dollars from motorists—most of them minorities—by a sheriff's drug squad.
Explanatory Journalism:
Mike Toner, The Atlanta Journal-Constitution, for "When Bugs Fight Back," a series that explored the diminishing effectiveness of antibiotics and pesticides.
Beat Reporting:
Paul Ingrassia and Joseph B. Whit, The Wall Street Journal, for often exclusive coverage of General Motors' management turmoil.
National Reporting:
David Maraniss, The Washington Post, for his revealing articles on the life and political record of candidate Bill Clinton.
International Reporting:
Roy Gutman, Newsday, For his courageous and persistent reporting that disclosed atrocities and other human rights violations in Croatia and Bosnia and Herzegovina.
Feature Writing:
George Lardner Jr., The Washington Post, for his unflinching examination of his daughter's murder by a violent man who had slipped through the criminal justice system.
Commentary:
Liz Balmaseda, The Miami Herald, for her commentary from Haiti about deteriorating political and social conditions and her columns about Cuban-Americans in Miami.
Criticism:
Michael Dirda, The Washington Post, for his book reviews.
Editorial Writing:
No Award Given
Editorial Cartooning:
Stephen R. Benson, The Arizona Republic
Spot News Photography:
Ken Geiger and William Snyder, The Dallas Morning News, for their dramatic photographs of the 1992 Summer Olympics in Barcelona.
Feature Photography:
Staff of Associated Press, for its portfolio of images drawn from the 1992 presidential campaign.

Letters awards 
Fiction:
A Good Scent from a Strange Mountain by Robert Olen Butler (Henry Holt)
History:
The Radicalism of the American Revolution by Gordon S. Wood (Alfred A. Knopf)
Biography or Autobiography:
Truman by David McCullough (Simon & Schuster)
Poetry:
The Wild Iris by Louise Glück (The Ecco Press)
General Non-Fiction:
Lincoln at Gettysburg: The Words That Remade America by Garry Wills (Simon & Schuster)

Arts awards 
Drama:
Angels in America: Millennium Approaches by Tony Kushner (TCG)
Music:
Trombone Concerto by Christopher Rouse (Boosey & Hawkes)
Premiered December 30, 1992, in New York by the New York Philharmonic.

References

External links
 

Pulitzer Prizes by year
Pulitzer Prize
Pulitzer Prize